Loricaria piracicabae is a species of catfish in the family Loricariidae. It is native to South America, where it occurs in the Piracicaba River basin in Brazil, for which it is named. The species reaches 17 cm (6.7 inches) in standard length and is believed to be a facultative air-breather.

References 

Loricariidae
Fish described in 1907